Stonyhurst St Mary's Hall (commonly known as S.M.H.) is the preparatory school to Stonyhurst College. It is an independent co-educational Catholic school, for ages 3–13, founded by the Society of Jesus (Jesuits). It is primarily a day school but has some boarders. As the lineal descendant of Hodder Place the school lays claim to be the oldest preparatory school in the country.

It is adjacent to Stonyhurst College, outside the small village of Hurst Green, near Clitheroe in Lancashire, England.

History

Jesuit College

Stonyhurst College was founded in 1593 as the English Jesuit College at St Omers in present-day France, at a time when Catholic education was prohibited by law in England. Having moved to Bruges in 1762 and then Liège in 1773, due to the persecution of the Jesuit order which ran the school, it finally settled at Stonyhurst in 1794. An attempt had been made to found a preparatory school to the College at St Omers, which would have been based in Boulogne, but this was abandoned and ultimately thwarted by the expulsion of the Jesuits from France in 1762. In 1768 new buildings were erected for a preparatory school at Bruges; this 'Little College' was closed in 1775, two years after the migration of the College to Liège. Thirteen years after the settlement in England the preparatory school was finally established in 1807.

Hodder Place

The Stonyhurst Estate donated by an old boy of the College at St Omers, Thomas Weld, included the Shireburn family Hall and a large building on the edge of the River Hodder, Hodder Place. The latter opened as a Jesuit novitiate when the Jesuits were formally re-established in Britain in 1803. Four years later, preparatory, the youngest pupils in the school, which had settled in the Hall, were transferred to Hodder Place. It was not until 1855, however, that the preparatory school was formally opened. The building underwent extension in 1836 and again in 1869 when two towers were constructed on either side.

Hodder Place continued to function as the preparatory school to the College until 1970 when it was shut and converted into residential flats. A rugby pitch still remains adjacent to the building and is very occasionally used today by St Mary's Hall both for sports and, during the summer, as a campsite for boarding pupils, under the supervision of the boarding staff.

St Mary's Hall

Between 1828 and 1830, a new building in Georgian style was constructed closer to the college and opened as the new novitiate, St Mary's Hall. In the nineteenth century, the poet Gerard Manley Hopkins trained as a priest there, and in the twentieth century John Tolkien, son of J.R.R. Tolkien, also trained there.

The building was extended with two symmetrical wings on either side in the 1850s when the symmetry of the College's south front was also finally completed.

St Mary's Hall continued to function as a seminary until 1926 when the seminarians were moved to Heythrop Hall in Oxfordshire. The building lay derelict until the English College moved in for the duration of the War. After their return to Rome, Figures Playroom was transferred from the College to St Mary's Hall, which opened as a middle school to Stonyhurst in 1946. When Hodder Place was closed in 1970, the pupils were moved across to St Mary's Hall to form Hodder Playroom. As successor to Hodder Place, SMH has a claim to be the oldest surviving preparatory school in Britain.

Since the addition of wings and the chapel extension in the nineteenth century, the buildings of St Mary's Hall changed comparatively little, except due to extensive fire damage in the 1980s, which destroyed much of the building's wooden panelling. In 1993, as part of the Stonyhurst Centenaries, celebrating the four-hundredth anniversary of the school's founding and the two-hundredth anniversary of its settlement at Stonyhurst the year later, a new state-of-the-art theatre was built in the grounds, the Centenaries Theatre. Since then, the old theatre has been transformed into a new entrance and library, and, with the transition to co-education in 1997, girls' dormitories have been created in the old craft, design, and technology attic, and new changing facilities for girls created at the back of the Sports Hall.

Hodder House

In 2004, the old gymnasium was converted into new Foundation Stage and KS1 facility, and named Hodder House. It educates children ages 3–7, making it now possible to undergo fifteen years of education at Stonyhurst.

Rebranding

Until 2007, SMH was officially known as "St Mary's Hall, Stonyhurst". The new Headmaster of the College, Andrew Johnson, insisted that a new name was necessary to bring the Stonyhurst campus closer together; SMH is now officially known as "Stonyhurst St Mary's Hall".

Religious life

St Mary's Hall is a Roman Catholic school, overseen by the Jesuit order. As such, the Jesuit ethos pervades the life of the school, with emphasis upon spiritual development, reasoning skills, and the creation of Men and Women for Others.

Mass is celebrated for the whole school on feast days, prayers are said at morning assembly, and night prayers in the chapel bring the day to a close. Charity is encouraged through the observance of CAFOD lunches, where money saved from simplifying the menu is given to charity, and through the school's own charity "Children for Children". Each year St Mary's Hall plays host to the "Stonyhurst Children's Holiday Trust" week, when children with disabilities or from disadvantaged backgrounds are looked after by senior pupils from the College.

St Mary's Hall has its own chapel where Mass is said, as well as the Stations of the Cross during Lent and the Rosary throughout October and May. A portable altar also enables the Centenaries Theatre to be used for school Masses.

Religious iconography is present throughout the school. A statue of the Sacred Heart, restored by the College stonemason in 2008, stands atop the entrance to the old Jesuit escape tunnel in the garden; a statue of Mary and a mosaic altar occupy a position beneath the main staircase in the hallway; there is a grotto beside the stone steps adjacent to the building, where night prayers are said during the Summer Term; and there are statues in the playrooms and crosses in every classroom and dormitory.

It is a long-standing tradition for pupils to write "May Verses". These are poems written in honour of Mary, Mother of Jesus. During the month of May they adorn the school's main staircase. Since the opening of Hodder House in 2004, the nativity, performed by the youngest members of the school, has become an annual fixture on the calendar.

As at the College, pupils write AMDG in the top, left-hand corner of any piece of work they do. It stands for the Latin phrase Ad Majorem Dei Gloriam which means "To the Greater Glory of God". At the end of a piece of work they write L.D.S. in the centre of the page. It stands for Laus Deo Semper which means "Praise be to God Always". These are both traditional Jesuit mottoes.

Religious Education is compulsory for all pupils at the school.

School organisation

The playroom system
Unlike most English public schools, Stonyhurst is organised horizontally by year groups (known as playrooms) rather than vertically by houses. Each playroom has an assigned playroom master, with each cohort moving through the playrooms, having a sequence of playroom masters (rather than being allocated into a house with housemaster for their whole time in the college, as happens in other schools).

Hodder House 
Pre-Nursery (2–3)
Nursery (3–4)
Pre-Prep (4–5)
PP 1 (5–6)
PP 2 (6–7)

Preparatory Playroom
 Lower Preparatory ('Lower Prep', 7–8) 
 Upper Preparatory ('Upper Prep', 8–9)

Elements Playroom (formerly Hodder Playroom along with Preparatory)
 Lower Elements (9–10)
 Upper Elements (10–11)

Figures Playroom
 Figures (11–12)

Rudiments Playroom
 Rudiments ('Ruds', 12–13)

Lines 

In addition to the playrooms, there is also a system which cuts through the year groups, the "Lines", which are used mostly for sports and competitions. The Lines and colours are as follows:
 Campion (Red) (after St Edmund Campion)
 St Omers (Yellow, though some brown rugby shirts as yellow shows too much dirt) (after St Omer, the French town where the school was founded)
 Shireburn (Green) (after the Shireburn family that built Stonyhurst Hall)
 Weld (Blue) (after the Weld family that donated Stonyhurst)

Pupils remain in the same Line throughout their time at the school, and if their parents, older siblings, or grandparents etc. were also pupils, automatically enter the same Line

Prefects

St Mary's Hall has a head boy and head girl, whose responsibilities include showing round prospective parents, and speech-giving. Various duties are also assigned to a staff-elected committee of Rudiments pupils.

Discipline

At St Mary's Hall, behaviour is typically rewarded or punished through the use of "Line Cards". Each pupil carries their card at all times. It is signed on the left-hand side with a brief explanation by the teacher as a punishment, or "debit". It is signed on the right-hand side with an explanation as a reward or "credit". The cards are coloured according to Line membership. The total number of credits and debits, in part, determines which line is awarded a special Line Supper.

Line points are allotted for academic work and also contribute to the Line Supper allocation.

As at the college, the most severe punishment is permanent expulsion, and below that, temporary suspension.

Uniform

Boys wear grey shorts and grey knee-length socks (except Rudiments and Figures who wear trousers), white shirt, green tie, green jumper, and green blazers.
Girls wear white blouses, green ties, green jumpers, green blazers and skirts in the College tartan, known as Lady Borrowdale's gift and based on a fragment of tartan worn by Bonnie Prince Charlie on his journey from Culloden across to Skye. This was also worn on Queen Elizabeth II's visit to the College in 1990.

Special ties are awarded for excellence in sport or for other achievements. Rudiments wear special ties with the school emblem repeated.  Furthermore, the committee wear similar ties with red sections.

Academic

Academic standards are high, owing in part to small classes, of usually no more than fifteen.

In Rudiments, pupils sit the Common Entrance and/or the 11+ Scholarship examinations in preparation for entry to the College. The Common Entrance examinations were only a recent addition to the school. Before that, pupils leaving St Mary's Hall took the Stonyhurst entrance exams, which were internally set.

Extra curricular

As at the College, St Mary's Hall follows a broad-based curriculum, encouraging participation in a range of activities including sport, music, drama, and art.

Drama
Drama classes are compulsory at St Mary's Hall, where additional classes may be taken in preparation for LAMDA examinations and entry into the Blackburn Festival. Plays are a regular fixture on the calendar, as are dramatic performances by pupils at the "Friday Presentations", when the school gathers on a Friday evening to be entertained by a talk or production in the Centenaries Theatre. Each year, the staff also stage the school pantomime; pupils are asked to gather in the theatre under the guise of a "staff announcement".

The Ark

SMH had until recently a small, rare-breeds farm with pigs, hens, rabbits, sheep, fish, and birds. Known as "The Ark", it was looked after by the children, under the supervision of staff. The Ark was closed due to animal welfare concerns.

Alumni

Notable Alumni:

George Archer-Shee, (Hodder Place alumnus), cause célèbre, his case was the inspiration for the play The Winslow Boy by Terence Rattigan.
Patrick Baladi, actor.
Iain Balshaw, rugby player and Rugby World Cup winner.
Sir Arthur Conan Doyle (Hodder Place alumnus), author of Sherlock Holmes.
Will Greenwood, rugby player (whose mother taught mathematics at SMH until 2007).
Vyvyan Holland (Hodder Place alumnus), younger son of Oscar Wilde.

Headmasters

Hodder Place
 style="font-size:100%;"
  
Superiors
1856 George Lambert SJ
1857 George Tickell SJ
1858 John Laurenson
1865 Francis Brownbill SJ
1869 Matthew Newsham SJ
1875 Walter Bridge SJ
1876 Francis Cassidy SJ
1878 William Kerr SJ
1880 Francis Scholes SJ
1882 William Burns SJ
1884 Charles Clarke SJ
1885 Francis Cassidy SJ
1916 Edward King SJ
1916 Walter Weld SJ
1925 Aloysius Parkinson SJ
1927 Leo Belton SJ
1939 Hubert McEvoy SJ
1942-9 Walter Weld SJ
 
Ministers
1949 Oswald Fishwick SJ
1959 John Firth SJ
Headmasters
1965 Denis Unsworth
1968 Mr. Earle
1970 Rob. Sinclair
1971 John Mallinson

St Mary's Hall
 style="font-size:100%;"

Ministers
1946 Dermot Whyte SJ
1948 Philip Prime SJ
1954 William Maher SJ
1959 Anthony Powell SJ

Headmasters
1965 R Vaughan Rigby OS
1968 Rae Carter
1978 Peter Anwyl
1990 Rory O'Brien
1999 Michael Higgins
2004 Laurence Crouch
2014 Ian Murphy

See also
Stonyhurst Estate
College of St. Omer
List of Stonyhurst Alumni/ae
Charities of Stonyhurst College
St Ignatius, founder of the Jesuits
 List of Jesuit sites in the United Kingdom
 List of Jesuit schools

References

External links
School Website
Virtual tour of SMH
Stonyhurst
Profile on the ISC
Independent Schools Inspectorate Inspection Reports

Preparatory schools in Lancashire
Stonyhurst College
 
Educational institutions established in 1807
1807 establishments in England
Roman Catholic private schools in the Diocese of Salford
Catholic boarding schools in England
Jesuit secondary schools in England